Simon Pagenaud (born 18 May 1984) is a French professional racing driver. He is contracted to drive the No. 60 Honda for Meyer Shank Racing in the IndyCar Series. After a successful career in sports car racing that saw him taking the top class championship title in the 2010 American Le Mans Series, he moved to the Indycar Series where he became the 2016 IndyCar champion and the 2019 Indianapolis 500 winner, becoming the first French driver to win the Indianapolis 500 since Gaston Chevrolet in 1920 and the first polesitter to have won the race since Helio Castroneves in 2009. Pagenaud has a Jack Russell Terrier named Norman who accompanies the racer to many of his races. Norman is also active on social media.

Simon Pagenaud won both the 2022 24 Hours of Daytona and 2023 24 Hours of Daytona with Meyer Shank Racing.

Early years
Born in Montmorillon, Pagenaud first worked at age 14 in the family's supermarket, eventually managing the video game department. After he attended business school, he returned to the supermarket. His family established a driving school that provided the funds for Pagenaud to begin his racing career.

Career
Pagenaud competed in 2002 and 2003 in French Formula Renault and in 2002 and 2004 competed in Formula Renault Eurocup. He then moved up to the Formula Renault 3.5 Series in 2005 where he finished 16th. In 2006 he went to the United States and won the Champ Car Atlantic with Team Australia in his rookie season by just a few points over Graham Rahal.

With his Atlantic championship, Pagenaud won US$2 million to apply towards a ride in Champ Car in 2007. On 13 February 2007 Pagenaud and Team Australia confirmed that he would be staying with the team, moving up to the Champ Car program. Pagenaud finished 8th in the points standings in what was a very consistent debut season, with three consecutive 4th-place finishes in the Canadian rounds of the championship.

After the demise of the Champ Car World Series, Pagenaud in 2008 moved to the American Le Mans Series co-driving the De Ferran Motorsports Acura ARX-01b LMP2 with former CART champion Gil de Ferran. He finished 14th in the driver's standings.

2009
In 2009, Pagenaud and de Ferran Motorsports took huge steps forward, with the duo taking second place overall in the American Le Mans Series LMP1 class, only 17 points behind drivers David Brabham and Scott Sharp of champions Highcroft Racing. The duo of Pagenaud and de Ferran drove the ARX-01 to three wins over a total of ten races and three pole positions, turning the fastest lap of the ALMS weekend 6 times.

Also during 2009, Pagenaud drove in the prestigious 24 Hours of Le Mans in LMP1 for the privateer Pescarolo Sport team in the Peugeot FAP 908. The team did not finish the race, completing 210 laps. The race was won by David Brabham, driving in the factory Peugeot Sport Total No. 9 FAP 908 along with former Formula One drivers Alexander Wurz and Marc Gené.

2010
For the 2010 ALMS season, Pagenaud moved over to the Patrón Highcroft racing team, replacing Scott Sharp to co-drive with Brabham in the ARX-01c in LMP1 after Sharp vacated the seat to jump to the ALMS GT2 class with his own Ferrari team. Through four rounds in the 2010 ALMS series, the team of Pagenaud and Brabham lead the LMP1 class with three wins and 91 points.

Pagenaud also earned a seat driving for the Peugeot factory team in 2010 in the prestigious 24 Hours of Le Mans on the renown Circuit de la Sarthe in the Peugeot FAP 908 No. 3 with Pedro Lamy and Sébastien Bourdais.

While the No. 3 Peugeot started from pole, it retired early before nightfall after a mere 38 laps when a suspension mount sheared from the car's tub. The same fate eventually befell the no.1 Peugeot car of Anthony Davidson/Gene/Wurz while in second place with mere hours left to go in the race, as Audi reclaimed the 24 Hours of Le Mans title it had retained for five years before Peugeot's 2009 win.

During the race, Pagenaud found himself competing against his Highcroft Racing team which traveled to Le Mans for the first time in its history. With Brabham driving the Acura in LMP2 alongside Marino Franchitti and Marco Werner, Highcroft maintained second through most of the race until a cooling issue sidelined the car for much of the race's final four hours.

2014

He won the inaugural Grand Prix of Indianapolis on 10 May. This was the first time his father watched him race at the venue.

2015
Pagenaud moved from Schmidt Peterson Motorsports to Team Penske in 2015. Pagenaud nearly won the 2015 Indianapolis 500, leading with less than 30 laps to go and engaging most of the race in a 3-way battle between Scott Dixon and Tony Kanaan. Pagenaud ended up being overtaken by the field and went on to finish 10th, while teammate Juan Pablo Montoya won the race. Pagenaud didn't win a race in 2015 but renewed his deal with TEAM Penske in 2016.

2016 
Pagenaud got off to the best start of his IndyCar career with five consecutive podiums, including three wins in a row. As the season progressed, Pagenaud and his teammate Will Power became the primary contenders for the championship. With a strong run at the end of the season, Pagenaud took his first IndyCar Series championship victory, giving Team Penske another championship victory in its 50th year of racing. He finished the season with five race victories and a total of eight podiums.

2017–2019 

Pagenaud would go winless throughout 2018.
Pagenaud won the Grand Prix of Indianapolis and he would also win the 2019 Indianapolis 500 from pole position. Pagenaud took the championship lead from Team Penske teammate Josef Newgarden, however Newgarden would retake the championship lead one race later in Detroit. Pagenaud would take pole and the win at the 2019 Honda Indy Toronto and took pole at the 2019 Iowa 300, though the win would go to Newgarden. 
Pagenaud is currently 3rd in the points standings, one point behind Andretti Autosport driver, Alexander Rossi and 34 points behind points leader Newgarden.

2020 
During the 2020 iRacing virtual Indy 500 event, Pagenaud was accused of deliberately crashing into leading driver Lando Norris, which led to his being accused of bad sportsmanship.

Pagenaud finished 2nd in the first race of the 2020 season at Texas Motor Speedway. Pagenaud finished 3rd at the IndyGP after starting in 20th.

Due to a fuel pump issue, Pagenaud's Iowa IndyCar 250 at Iowa Speedway race 1 entry failed to make qualifying and started the race at the back of the grid in 23rd. By lap 178, Pagenaud took the lead and held on to win the 250 lap race.

2021 

Pagenaud would enter 2021 as a contract year. 2021 was a difficult year for Pagenaud and Team Penske in general, as the team only recorded three wins of the season with Pagenaud scoring none of them. Pagenaud's best results of the season were two third-place finishes, one at St. Petersburg and the other at the 2021 Indianapolis 500. Outside of those finishes, he would frequently be beset by poor luck and on-track confrontations with his teammates. By the end of the season the racing press reported Pagenaud did not intend to re-sign with Team Penske.

2022 
After a difficult 2021 campaign, Pagenaud left the Penske team & joined Meyer Shank Racing alongside former Penske teammate, Helio Castroneves.

2023 
In 2023, Pagenaud returned to the 24 Hours of Le Mans, taking part in the LMP2 class for Cool Racing. It would be the first time Pagenaud competed in the race since 2011, where he finished second overall driving for the Peugeot Sport factory team.

Motorsports career results

Career summary

* Season still in progress.

Formula Renault 3.5 Series results
(key)

American open-wheel racing results
(key) (Races in bold indicate pole position, races in italics indicate fastest race lap)

Champ Car Atlantic

Champ Car

IndyCar Series

 1 The Las Vegas Indy 300 was abandoned after Dan Wheldon died from injuries sustained in a 15-car crash on lap 11.

Indianapolis 500

Sports car racing

Le Mans 24 Hours results

American Le Mans Series results

 1 Driver competed for the Intercontinental Le Mans Cup, no points awarded for the American Le Mans Series.

IMSA SportsCar Championship results
(key) (Races in bold indicate pole position)

Le Mans Series results

 1 Driver competed for the Intercontinental Le Mans Cup, no points awarded for the Le Mans Series.

Intercontinental Le Mans Cup results

 1 Driver did not run for the Intercontinental Le Mans Cup.

Touring car racing

Complete V8 Supercar results

+ Not Eligible for points

References

External links

 
 IndyCar Driver Page
 
 
 IndyCar 36: Simon Pagenaud – IndyCar documentary

1984 births
French racing drivers
Living people
Champ Car drivers
IndyCar Series drivers
IndyCar Series champions
Atlantic Championship drivers
German Formula Renault 2.0 drivers
French Formula Renault 2.0 drivers
Formula Renault Eurocup drivers
American Le Mans Series drivers
24 Hours of Le Mans drivers
European Le Mans Series drivers
World Series Formula V8 3.5 drivers
Supercars Championship drivers
Indianapolis 500 drivers
Indianapolis 500 winners
24 Hours of Daytona drivers
WeatherTech SportsCar Championship drivers
Auto Sport Academy drivers
La Filière drivers
ART Grand Prix drivers
Graff Racing drivers
OAK Racing drivers
Tech 1 Racing drivers
Walker Racing drivers
Oreca drivers
Pescarolo Sport drivers
Peugeot Sport drivers
Highcroft Racing drivers
Dreyer & Reinbold Racing drivers
HVM Racing drivers
Arrow McLaren SP drivers
Extreme Speed Motorsports drivers
Team Penske drivers
Garry Rogers Motorsport drivers
Meyer Shank Racing drivers
Corvette Racing drivers
De Ferran Motorsports drivers
Formule Campus Renault Elf drivers
Action Express Racing drivers
Level 5 Motorsports drivers
Stone Brothers Racing drivers